Holtermannia is a genus of fungi in the order Holtermanniales. Species produce groups of horn-like gelatinous basidiocarps (fruit bodies) on wood and have associated yeast states. The genus is distributed in southeast Asia and Brazil, and contains six species.

The genus name of Holtermannia is in honour of Carl Holtermann (1866 - 1923) (Norwegian-)German botanist (Mycology) and Professor of Botany at the
University of Berlin.

The genus was circumscribed by Pier Andrea Saccardo and Giovanni Battista Traverso in Syll. Fung. vol.19 on page 871 in 1910.

Species known
According to GBIF;
 Holtermannia coralloides 
 Holtermannia corniformis 
 Holtermannia damicornis 
 Holtermannia pinguis 
 Holtermannia prolifera 
 Holtermannia pulchella

References

External links

Tremellomycetes